Brigadier General Antonio Rodríguez Balinas (February 28, 1928 – September 21, 2011) was the first commander of the Office of the First U.S. Army Deputy Command.

Early years
Rodríguez Balinas was born and raised in the town of Adjuntas, Puerto Rico, where he received his primary and secondary education.

He joined the United States Army upon graduating from the University of Puerto Rico, where he earned is Bachelor of Arts degree in Economics and a Doctorate in Law from University of Puerto Rico School of Law. Rodríguez Balinas entered the Officer Candidate School program and was commissioned a second lieutenant upon completing the program.  At the outbreak of the Korean War, he was assigned to the 65th Infantry Regiment.

Korean War
On April 23, 1951, Rodríguez Balinas, who was assigned to "F" Co., of the 65th Infantry, 3rd Infantry Division, defended the left flank of his company from constant enemy attacks at Ognyo-Bong, Hill 305 at a great risk to his life. He was awarded the Silver Star Medal and promoted to the rank of first lieutenant for his bravery.  On December 23, 1951, he  fearlessly walked through a lethal hail of enemy fire directly toward the hostile bunker of the enemy, hurled his hand grenades and singlehandedly completely destroyed the enemy position and its occupants near Sorgyon-Myon, Korea.  For his actions he was awarded his second Silver Star and a Purple Heart.

Later career

Rodríguez Balinas continued his academic education and earned a PhD degree in Law from the UPR. In March 1968, the reserve units in Puerto Rico and the U.S. Virgin Islands of the United States Army were organized into the 166th Support Group.  On July 14, 1973, the then-Colonel Rodríguez Balinas took command of the 166th Support Group and was given full command and control of all USAR (United States Army Reserve) units in Puerto Rico and the U.S. Virgin Islands. One of Colonel Rodríguez Balinas's accomplishments was to have all the missions and functions of a major U.S. Army Reserve Command under the First U.S. Army.  He wanted full autonomy for the Army Reserve forces in Puerto Rico.

In February 1977, the USAR Forces in Puerto Rico became a General Office Command with the establishment of the Office of the First U.S. Army Deputy Command with Antonio Rodríguez Balinas, who was promoted to the rank of brigadier general, as its first General Officer.  In 1979, the USAR Forces in Puerto Rico were awarded the Best Major U.S. Army Reserve Command Award. Brigadier General Rodríguez Balinas held the position of General Officer until February 27, 1988, when he retired after 37 years of active and reserve duty. He was awarded the Legion of Merit Medal upon his retirement.

Death
He died on September 21, 2011, in Río Piedras, Puerto Rico, and was buried with military honors in the Puerto Rico National Cemetery located in the city of Bayamon.

Military awards and decorations
Among Rodríguez Balinas' decorations were the following:

Foreign decoration

The Bravery Gold Medal of Greece was given by the government of Greece to the 65th Infantry Regiment and to the members of the regiment who fought in the Korean War.
  Chryssoun Aristion Andrias (Bravery Gold Medal of Greece)
Congressional Gold Medal

On June 10, 2014, President Barack Obama, signed the legislation known as  "The Borinqueneers CGM Bill" at an official ceremony. The Bill honors the 65th Infantry Regiment with the Congressional Gold Medal.

Silver Star citations

Notes

Further reading

See also

List of Puerto Ricans
List of Puerto Rican military personnel
65th Infantry Regiment
Borinqueneers Congressional Gold Medal

References

External links

1928 births
2011 deaths
United States Army generals
Puerto Rican Army personnel
Puerto Rican military officers
United States Army personnel of the Korean War
United States Army officers
United States Army reservists
Recipients of the Silver Star
Recipients of the Legion of Merit
People from Adjuntas, Puerto Rico
University of Puerto Rico alumni